The Lon D. Wright Power Plant is a 130 MW (megawatt) coal-fired power plant owned and operated by the City of Fremont Department of Utilities located in Fremont, Nebraska. The plant consists of 3 units labeled 6, 7, and 8 as a continuation of five units that were previously housed in the downtown facility.

Unit 6 
Unit 6 is a 17 MW coal-fired Babcock & Wilcox water tube boiler with a General Electric turbine and generator that entered commercial service in 1957. The unit can also be run on natural gas.

Unit 7 
Unit 7 is a 22 MW Babcock & Wilcox water tube boiler with a General Electric turbine and generator that entered commercial service in 1963. The unit can also be run on natural gas.

Unit 8 
Unit 8 is a 92 MW Babcock & Wilcox water tube boiler with a General Electric turbine and generator that entered commercial service in 1977. The unit can also be run on natural gas.

Air Quality Control System (AQCS) 
In July 2013, the Fremont City council awarded a $46.758 million bid to Fagen Inc. to add emission control equipment to Unit 8 to meet the EPA's Clean Air standards. The project was completed and commissioned in late 2015.

References

External links 

 

Power stations in Nebraska
Coal-fired power stations in Nebraska
Buildings and structures in Nebraska